Giulio Giacinto Avellino (c. 1645 – c. 1700) was an Italian painter of the Baroque period.

He was born in Messina, and thus is known also as il Messinese. Giulio died in Ferrara, where he mainly painted. He trained with Salvator Rosa, and painted landscapes with ruins and mythic figures in his master's style. His sibling, Onofrio Avellino (c. 1674–1741), was also a painter. Niccolò Cartissani is described as also a contemporary landscape painter from Messina.

References 

1640s births
1700s deaths
Painters from Messina
17th-century Italian painters
Italian male painters
18th-century Italian painters
Italian Baroque painters
Painters of ruins
Year of birth uncertain
18th-century Italian male artists